Publix Field at Joker Marchant Stadium is a baseball field in Lakeland, Florida. The 8,500-seat stadium was opened in 1966 and has had multiple renovations, most recently in 2017. It was named after local resident and former Lakeland Parks and Recreation Director Marcus "Joker" Marchant. It is the spring training home of the Detroit Tigers and the regular-season home of the minor league affiliates Lakeland Flying Tigers and Gulf Coast Tigers. 

On March 15, 2011, the largest crowd in the stadium's history (10,307 people) watched a spring training game between the Detroit Tigers and the Boston Red Sox.

Expansions
The stadium could seat 4,900 people when it opened in 1966. In 1988, a bleacher section was added down the left field line, increasing seating capacity to 7,027. In 2002, Joker Marchant Stadium was renovated. The State of Florida's $4.5 million grant was the biggest chunk of the financing, while the Polk County Tourist Development Council chipped in $2 million. The remainder of the renovation's cost was paid for by the Tigers and City of Lakeland, increasing capacity to its present 8,500.

In October 2014, the Lakeland City Commission announced part of a new agreement with the Detroit Tigers included the start of a $37 million renovation and upgrade of the 50-year-old stadium, starting in April 2016 after Major League Baseball Spring Training. Funding provided in part by the Detroit Tigers, the City of Lakeland and Polk County. Two construction firms -- Barton Malow of Southfield, Michigan, and Rodda Construction of Lakeland -- were chosen by the City Commission to oversee the project.

Naming rights
Under a 20-year deal that ends in 2036, the stadium was renamed Publix Field at Joker Marchant Stadium on the first day of MLB's 2017 Spring Training. The Publix supermarket chain is headquartered in Lakeland and their hometown field is the only sports complex for which they have purchased naming rights.

Gallery

References

External links
Stadium information at Detroit Tigers website
Joker Marchant Stadium Views - Ball Parks of the Minor Leagues

Detroit Tigers spring training venues
Sports venues in Lakeland, Florida
Minor league baseball venues
Grapefruit League venues
1966 establishments in Florida
Sports venues completed in 1966
Florida Complex League ballparks
Florida State League ballparks